Chabowski (feminine: Chabowska; plural: Chabowscy) is a Polish surname. Habowski (feminine: Habowska; plural: Habowscy) is a homophone. Notable people include:

 Marcin Chabowski (born 1986), Polish long-distance runner
 Bolesław Habowski (1914–1979), Polish football player

Polish-language surnames